Bernal Heights Summit or Bernal Heights Hill is a hill in the San Francisco, California neighborhood of Bernal Heights. Upper elevations are part of Bernal Heights Park, which is managed by the San Francisco Recreation & Parks Department. At its highest elevation (466 ft.) is a privately-owned equipment building and 50-foot tall telecommunications tower. The tower does not have an official name, but some residents call it "Sutrito", as it resembles a shorter version of Sutro Tower. The park and summit are largely surrounded by Bernal Heights Boulevard.

Ecology
Unusual flora and fauna can be found on Bernal Hill. Wildflowers include the footsteps of spring, blue-eyed grass, checkerbloom, shooting star and yellow mariposa lily. Bernal Hill was one of the earliest hills in San Francisco to be re-colonized by wild coyotes.

Geology
Bernal Hill, along with the other hills in the San Francisco area, is a folded hill; it was created by the "wrinkling up" effect of the Pacific plate subducting under the North American plate, when the North American and Pacific plates were converging around 150 million years ago. Near the summit are folded layers of very hard rock called radiolarian chert. It is a sedimentary silicate rock which gets its silica content from the shells of microscopic creatures called radiolaria. The red color comes from iron oxide. In between the layers of chert are thin layers of shale in many different colors from the same red as the surrounding rock to white, green, and purple. Other types of rocks and minerals on the hill include serpentinite, jasper, and clay.

See also
List of hills in San Francisco
List of summits of the San Francisco Bay Area

References

Hills of San Francisco